America Reports with John Roberts & Sandra Smith is an American television news program on Fox News hosted by John Roberts and Sandra Smith. Episodes air at 1:00 PM ET on weekdays. The show focuses on the day's events and features interviews, current event updates, and comprehensive reporting. The show has been a part of FNC's lineup since January 18, 2021.

Synopsis 
The program continues coverage of stories followed during prior hours of Fox News programs. The show often takes a swifter pace compared to the network's other programming, making a larger focus of the program on breaking-news events with live correspondents. The coverage includes correspondents on location, in studio, in addition to analysis from pundits or experts.

Smith, who joined Fox Business as a reporter in 2007 had previously served as a co-host of Outnumbered from 2014 until she was named a co-anchor of America's Newsroom in 2018,  where she worked until she joined America Reports in 2021. 

Roberts joined Fox News as a senior national correspondent in 2011 after departing CNN. Prior to joining America Reports he served as a White House Correspondent throughout the Trump Administration from 2017—2021.

Guest hosts for the show include Gillian Turner, Mike Emanuel, Aisha Hasnie, Trace Gallagher, Bill Hemmer, Anita Vogel, and Jacqui Heinrich.

America Reports 
Current Hosts
Sandra Smith, co-anchor (2021—present) 
John Roberts, co-anchor (2021—present)
Correspondent Team
Peter Doocy, White House Correspondent (2021—present)
Jacqui Heinrich, White House Correspondent (2021—present)
Chad Pergram, Senior Congressional Correspondent (2019—present)
Aisha Hasnie, Congressional Correspondent (2021—present)
Gillian Turner, Washington Correspondent (2020—present)
Bill Melugin, National Correspondent (2021—present)

Location 
Smith broadcasts Live in from Fox's World Headquarters in New York City in Studio J while Roberts broadcasts from Fox's Washington D.C. bureau.

References

External links 
 Shepard Smith Reporting on FoxNews.com (archived October 11, 2019)
 Shepard Smith's Bio on FoxNews.com (archived October 3, 2019)

2002 American television series debuts
2019 American television series endings
2000s American television news shows
2010s American television news shows
English-language television shows
Fox News original programming